Ignace Heinrich (31 July 1925 – 9 January 2003) was a French athlete who competed mainly in the decathlon. He was born in Ebersheim, Bas-Rhin, Alsace.

He competed for France in the decathlon at the 1948 Summer Olympics held in London, Great Britain, winning a silver medal. He died in Carnoux-en-Provence.

Further reading
 :de:Volker Kluge: Olympische Sommerspiele. Die Chronik. Band 2: London 1948 – Tokio 1964. Sportverlag, Berlin 1998, .
 Peter Matthews (Hrsg.): Athletics 2003. SportsBooks, Cheltenham 2003, .
 Ekkehard zur Megede: The Modern Olympic Century 1896–1996 Track and Field Athletics. Deutsche Gesellschaft für Leichtathletik-Dokumentation e. V., Neuss 1999.

References

1925 births
2003 deaths
Sportspeople from Bas-Rhin
French decathletes
Olympic silver medalists for France
Athletes (track and field) at the 1948 Summer Olympics
Athletes (track and field) at the 1952 Summer Olympics
Olympic athletes of France
European Athletics Championships medalists
Medalists at the 1948 Summer Olympics
Olympic silver medalists in athletics (track and field)
20th-century French people
21st-century French people